New College Valley lies south of Cape Bird, on ice-free slopes above Caughley Beach on Ross Island, Antarctica.  It faces north-west and carries meltwater from the Cape Bird ice cap during the summer.  It is protected as Antarctic Specially Protected Area (ASPA) No.116 because it contains some of the richest stands of mosses, with associated microflora and fauna, in the Ross Sea region.

References

Valleys of Antarctica
Landforms of Ross Island
Antarctic Specially Protected Areas